The following is a list of events during the Israeli–Palestinian conflict in 2023.

January

1 January 
Following the United Nations General Assembly's adoption of a resolution to seek an International Court of Justice opinion on Israel's "prolonged occupation, settlement and annexation of the Palestinian territory occupied since 1967", newly elected Israeli far-right lawmaker Zvika Fogel was asked whether the occupation in the West Bank is permanent. He said he "cannot argue with the facts. As of right now, the occupation is permanent. And as of right now I would like to continue to apply Israeli sovereignty over all the areas that I can." Earlier, incoming prime minister Benjamin Netanyahu called the referral "despicable" and said "The Jewish people are not occupiers in their own land nor occupiers in our eternal capital Jerusalem and no U.N. resolution can distort that historical truth". To the concern of the US administration, Netanyahu has made agreements with coalition partners to expand Israeli settlements and legalize dozens of Israeli outposts.

2 January 
Israeli forces killed two Palestinians, 22 and 25-years-old, in a demolition raid on Kafr Dan, northwest of Jenin. The military said they were attacked with gunfire, rocks and firebombs. The raid was to demolish the homes of two Palestinians killed on 14 September 2022 during an attack that killed an Israeli soldier. Human rights groups see such demolitions as "collective punishment".

The new Israeli government told the Israeli High Court that the state would reverse its previous position that Israeli settlers leave Homesh, a yeshiva built on private Palestinian property, and that the government intends to change the Disengagement Law. The Palestinian landowners appealed to the court because they have been prevented from reaching their property due to settlers in the Israeli outpost blocking access. The State Attorney's Office said "the political echelon wishes to announce that, in accordance with the coalition agreements that were signed, it intends to act as soon as possible to amend the guidelines permitting Israelis to remain" and requested a further three months to submit another opinion.

The IDF changed the guidelines for opening fire against Palestinian stone-throwers so that shooting will only be carried out in life-threatening situations, when there is no alternative. 
The previous guideline from November 2021, allowed firing on "suspects who hurl Molotov cocktails or rocks, even after the deadly object is no longer in their hands."

3 January 
Israeli forces killed a 15-year-old Palestinian during a raid on Dheisheh refugee camp, south of Bethlehem. Israeli media reported that the military said that they fired at Palestinians throwing Molotov cocktails.

The US, the EU, the UK, France, Turkey, Saudi Arabia, Jordan and the UAE all condemned a visit to the Temple Mount/Al-Aqsa compound by National Security Minister Itamar Ben-Gvir, citing the need to maintain the status quo and avoid increasing tension.

A rocket was fired towards southern Israel. Reports indicate the rocket failed to reach Israeli territory and exploded in Gaza. The rocket fire came after Itamar Ben-Gvir's  visit to the Temple Mount/Al-Aqsa compound, which Hamas had warned would be a "detonator".

4 January 
Israeli forces killed a 16-year-old Palestinian during an arrest raid on Balata refugee camp. The military said that Border Police fired in response to the throwing of Molotov cocktails, explosive devices and stones.

In response to Israel's High Court earlier decision to grant the government 90 days to explain its decision to reverse course on Homesh, the US said that "The Homesh outpost in the West Bank is illegal. It is illegal even under Israeli Law. Our call to refrain from unilateral steps certainly includes any decision to create a new settlement, to legalize outposts or allowing building of any kind deep in the West Bank, adjacent to Palestinian communities or on private Palestinian land."

5 January 
A UNSC meeting emphasized the need to maintain the status quo at Al Aqsa Mosque/Temple Mount following the visit there by Itamar Ben-Gvir but took no further action. Jordan, which called for the meeting, summoned the Israeli ambassador over the issue. The US deputy UN ambassador, Robert Wood, told the council "We note that Prime Minister Netanyahu’s governing platform calls for preservation of the status quo with relation to the holy places. We expect the government of Israel to follow through on that commitment."

Israeli forces killed a 16-year-old Palestinian in Nablus during an arrest raid in Balata Refugee Camp. Local media sources shared surveillance footage of him walking and running before getting killed.

6 January 
Israel approved a series of measures following the Palestinian request that the UN seek an ICJ opinion about Israel's occupation. The measures include the freezing of Palestinian construction plans in Area C, offsetting Palestinian tax revenues and "action against organizations that promote hostile activity, including political-legal activity against Israel under the guise of humanitarian activity." Palestine condemned the moves.

11 January 
A 21-year-old Palestinian succumbed to wounds sustained earlier during an Israeli raid on Balata refugee camp.

Palestinians in occupied East Jerusalem raised Palestinian flags in response to a decision on 8 January by Ben-Gvir, who ordered Israeli police to remove Palestinian flags from public spaces and said the Palestine Liberation Organisation was a terrorist organisation. Ben-Gvir also compared the flag to a Nazi symbol on Twitter. Amnesty International said the Israeli restrictions against flying the flag were "a shameless attempt to legitimise racism".

A 19-year-old Palestinian was killed by an armed Israeli civilian at the illegal outpost of Havat Yehuda (Yehuda farm) in the South Hebron Hills. The Palestinian stabbed the 25-year-old Israeli owner of the illegal farm in the head, moderately wounding him. According to the owner's wife, the assailant was then shot and killed by another Israeli man who had come to repair an electrical problem and witnessed the attack.

12 January 
[Conflicting accounts] Israeli forces killed a 41-year-old Palestinian during a raid on the Qalandia refugee camp. According to Al Jazeera he was shot by an Israeli sniper while standing with other family members on the roof of their home watching the raid, his son having been arrested 10 minutes earlier while Haaretz reported that the man was shot while trying to prevent the arrest of his son. The military said that during the raid "suspects threw stones and cement blocks from the roofs of the houses at the forces in a way that endangered the lives of the fighters, who responded by dispersing demonstrations and shooting" and that "an injury was detected", but did not confirm the death.

Israeli forces killed a 25-year-old Palestinian during a raid on Qabatiya. An 18-year-old Palestinian who was critically wounded at the time, later died from his wounds.

13 January 
Israeli forces killed two Palestinians, a 23 and a 24-year-old, during a raid on Jaba, south of Jenin. The military said its soldiers opened fire after gunmen in a passing vehicle shot at them. A 19-year-old Palestinian shot by Israeli soldiers in  Kufr Dan on 2 January succumbed to his wounds raising the number of Palestinians killed to 12 in 2023.

15 January 
[conflicting reports] A 45-year-old Palestinian was killed by Israeli forces. According to Al Jazeera, citing Palestinian media, the man was reportedly told to get out of his car and argued with soldiers before being shot whereas Israeli media reported that, according to the Israeli military, the man had a knife and had been shot after approaching a soldier's post and pulling out a knife. A later report by the Independent/AP, states "The Israeli military said soldiers spotted a vehicle they considered suspicious which refused to stop for inspection near the West Bank town of Silwad. A clash broke out when the soldiers attempted to detain one of the people in the vehicle, and soldiers opened fire when one of the vehicle's passengers tried to grab a soldier's weapon." According to the New Arab, "The man's son, Qusai Kahla, told AFP he was in the car with his father when they were stopped at the checkpoint and said "Soldiers came and they sprayed pepper spray on my face and pulled me out of the car, I don't know what happened after that, I found out from my uncle that my dad was killed." Subsequently, the Israeli army changed its explanation, Having initially said that a man in a car threw stones and then approached soldiers with a knife, it is now said that soldiers called for the man to stop and  used tear gas when he refused. Then the man refused to get out of his car, there was a confrontation, that he tried to steal a weapon from a soldier and was shot. On 23 January, the Times of Israel reported that the military launched an investigation after concluding that the Palestinian was unnecessarily shot dead and not a terrorist as originally reported.

16 January 
The Palestinian Ministry of health said that Israeli forces killed a 14-year-old Palestinian during a raid on the Dheisheh Refugee camp. The Israeli army said that it was in response to rocks, Molotov cocktails and improvised explosive devices thrown at them. Palestinian Prisoner’s Society reported that soldiers searched for a Palestinian Journalist and entered the homes of his mother, finding a 50-year-old Italian woman activist accompanied her mother. The Italian women was arrested with not clear reason and later was returned to Italy.

Hamas released an undated video allegedly of Israeli hostage Avera Mengistu. No confirmed footage of Mengistu has been released since he was detained in September 2014. A brother of Mengistu's was unable to confirm whether or not the person in the video was his brother Avera, although he did not believe it was him.The Prime Minister's Office released a statement maintaining that "the State of Israel invests all its resources and efforts to return its missing sons held captive to their home".

The UN, OCHA issued the Protection of Civilians Report covering the period 20 December 2022 – 9 January 2023. During the reporting period, 5 Palestinians were killed by Israeli forces (4 year to date) and 0 Israelis were killed by Palestinians. There were 202 Israeli military search and arrest operations in the West Bank (101 year to date), and 69 Palestinian-owned structures were demolished (33 year to date).

17 January 
More than 90 UN member states condemned and issued statements calling for the reversal of punitive measures of the recently imposed sanctions on Palestine Authority. Many of the member states had voted against or abstained on a recent UNGA resolution calling for an ICJ advisory opinion on the occupation.

Israeli forces killed a 40-year-old Palestinian at Halhul near Hebron. Israeli forces said the man shot at soldiers operating a checkpoint. The man left a will saying he decided to "sacrifice his life to protect holy sites and the honor of Islam and Muslims".

18 January 
At a UNSC meeting, the recent sanctions imposed by Israel on the Palestinian Authority, were discussed. US ambassador Linda Thomas-Greenfield stated that the US will "continue to oppose unilateral actions that endanger the stability and the viability of a two states solution...this includes actions to the historic status quo at the Haram al-Sharif/Temple Mount, this includes settlement building and the legalization of outposts, and this includes, annexation, acts of terrorism, and incitement."

19 January 
The Palestinian Ministry of Health stated that overnight raid on Jenin Camp killed a 57-year-old teacher and a 28-year-old armed Jenin Bridgades senior member. Israeli military stated that “hits were identified” and a soldier was wounded by a explosive device. Around four Palestinians were wounded and six Palestinians were allegedly arrested, including two sons of the Palestinian Islamic Jihad leader.

21 January 
The IDF stated that a 42-year-old Palestinian was shot dead due to the person attempting to stab an armed Israeli civilian at the illegal Sde Ephraim farm outpost near the town of Kafr Ni'ma. CCTV footage and photographs of the scene showed that the alleged attacker attempted to stab using a screwdriver but was killed. Palestinian Islamic Jihad claimed the deceased as a member.

25 January 
Israeli forces said that a 20-year-old Palestinian was shot dead after an attempt to stab a soldier near the Israeli settlement of Kedumim. Later, Israel army released a CCTV video that showed a man getting out of a car and running towards the soldiers with an object in his hand.

Law enforcement officials stated that a 17-year-old Palestinian carrying a fake gun was shot dead during a raid on Shu'fat camp in East Jerusalem.

26 January 

During a raid on Jenin camp, nine Palestinians including a 60-year-old woman were killed. Israel's military said that it was response to intelligence about imminent attacks by the Islamic Jihad against Israelis. The death toll rose to 10, after a 22-year-old Palestinian in Al-Ram was shot during confrontations between Israeli forces and people protesting the killing of nine Palestinians.

The IDF stated that two rockets were intercepted by the Iron Dome system from the Gaza Strip towards southern Israel and no casualties or damages were reported. The Rocket launch was stated to be a response to killing of nine Palestinians, and Israel activated rocket sirens in Ashkelon, Zikim and Karmia.

27 January 

The Israeli military announced that it had targeted Palestinian militant group's training sites after 10 or more rockets were launched from the Gaza Strip; according to the military, four were intercepted, three fell in open areas, and several inside Gaza. According to witnesses and local media, Israeli drones launched at least 13 missiles strikes that had hit al-Maghazi refugee camp in the central Gaza Strip. Around 2 missiles strikes hit from israeli drone prelude to larger airstrikes carried out by fighter jets.

Seven Israelis were killed and three wounded in a shooting attack in Neve Yaakov, East Jerusalem. According to the Israeli police, the gunman, a 21-year-old Palestinian, was shot and killed. A Hamas spokesperson said that the shooting was "a natural response" for the earlier raid on Jenin.

A 16-year-old Palestinian succumbed to wounds from Israeli gunfire during clashes in Silwan on 25 January. The Israeli police said he was one of a pair of teenagers shot after throwing firebombs and fireworks at officers.

28 January 
Two people, a 22-year-old off-duty IDF officer and his 45-year-old father were seriously injured in a shooting attack in Silwan, East Jerusalem. The shooter, reportedly a 13-year-old resident of East Jerusalem, was shot by two civilians who had licensed weapons and is now being held and treated. An IDF soldier was also lightly injured in the incident. The US Department of Defense condemned the shooting, while Hamas welcomed the attack, describing it as a confirmation of resistance action in all the occupied territories.

29 January 
An 18-year-old Palestinian was killed near Kedumim. The Israeli military said the man was armed with a handgun and killed by a settlement security team. WAFA reported that the circumstances were unclear.

30 January 
Israeli forces killed a 26-year-old Palestinian man in Hebron. The Israeli military said the man had driven his car into a soldier at a checkpoint and then troops fired at the vehicle as it attempted to flee but did not say it was a deliberate attack and that the incident would be further investigated.

February

3 February
Israeli forces killed an unarmed 26-year-old Palestinian near Nablus. The military said the man ran towards soldiers, who ordered him to stop and when he failed to do so was shot. An Israeli military source said a suicide note was found on the body.

The United Nations Office for the Coordination of Humanitarian Affairs (OCHA) issued the Protection of Civilians Report covering the period 10 – 30 January 2023. During the reporting period, 31 Palestinians (35 year to date) were killed by Israeli forces, 7 Israelis (including 1 foreigner) (7 year to date) were killed by Palestinians. There were 233 Israeli military search and arrest operations in the West Bank (340 year to date), and 91 Palestinian-owned structures were demolished (131 year to date).

6 February
Israeli forces killed five Palestinians in a gunfight with Israeli forces in the Aqbat Jabr refugee camp near Jericho. The military said that soldiers were attempting to arrest gunmen accused of an attempted attack the previous week at a nearby Israeli settlement, since when the town had been under a semi-blockade. The Israeli military claims that the individuals targeted in the operation were linked to Hamas. While Hamas did not confirm the connection, they praised the actions of the targeted individuals and acknowledged having an active cell in the area.

7 February
Israel froze a planned demolition in Wadi Quddum, an area of Silwan in East Jerusalem, that would have left 11 families and 100 residents homeless. The Prime Minister's office requested the delay but the demolition order remains in force. Human rights organizations and diplomats applied pressure to prevent the move and US Secretary of State Anthony Blinken recently requested Israel to cease home demolitions. New National Security Minister Itamar Ben Gvir insists the authorities demolish East Jerusalem homes built without permits that are virtually impossible to obtain.

A 17-year-old Palestinian was killed by Israeli forces during clashes East of Nablus. The miltary said he was a gunman who had fired on troops. The Lions' Den group said he was from the Askar refugee camp near Nablus but did not claim him as a member.

9 February
Israeli forces killed a 22-year-old Palestinian at the entrance to the al-Fawwar refugee camp near Hebron. The military said that he tried to stab a soldier.

10 February 

A suspected car-ramming attack occurred at the entrance of the Ramot settlement in East Jerusalem, killing two people and injuring at least five others. The fatalities included a 6-year-old boy and a man in his 20s. Subsequently, an 8-year-old child injured in the attack succumbed to his wounds. The driver, a 31-year-old Palestinian citizen of Israel, father of three and resident of Isawiya, was shot dead at the scene. According to the driver's family, he was released from a psychiatric ward the day before. Israeli security officials said the family statement was credible. One relative said "I'm sorry for what happened. It's a tragedy, but it's not a terror attack". The attacker lived in rented accommodation so the Israeli authorities sealed his family's home prior to a potential demolition. Such sealing and demolition has long been Israeli policy but is considered illegal as collective punishment in international law. Subsequently Shin Bet concluded that the residence should not be demolished and should not have been sealed not least because the attacker was psychologically unstable.

11 February 
An Israeli settler killed a 27-year-old Palestinian in Qarawat Bani Hassan village. According to the IDF, an initial investigation said a confrontation occurred between settlers and Palestinians near the Havat Yair outpost and that one of the settlers opened fire after a stone hit another Israeli in the head. The Jerusalem Post reported that the settlers said the shooting occurred after one of them was injured by fireworks that were fired at them by Palestinians. Calling for an investigation, the US Office of Palestinian Affairs tweeted “We strongly condemn the shooting of Methkal Rayyan by an Israeli settler from the illegal Havat Yair outpost in Salfit".

The Israeli military reported that a single rocket launched from the Gaza Strip towards southern Israel was successfully intercepted by the Iron Dome air defense system. Rocket sirens were heard in the town of Kibbutz Nahal Oz, causing alarm among local residents. There were no reports of any casualties or damage caused by the attack.

12 February 
Israeli forces killed a 14-year-old Palestinian during an arrest raid on Jenin. Two others were seriously wounded.

Israel approved the legalization of nine illegal settler outposts. A US spokesman said "We strongly oppose expansion of settlements, and we're deeply concerned by reports about a process to legalize outposts that are illegal under Israeli law. We are seeking more information from the Israeli government on what has actually been decided." The Palestinian Authority condemned the decision as crossing "all red lines".

13 February 

Israeli aircraft conducted a series of airstrikes in the Gaza Strip. No casualties were reported. The military said the strikes were in response to a rocket firing and that it had struck "an underground complex containing raw materials used for the manufacturing of rockets."

Israeli forces killed a 21-year-old Palestinian during an arrest raid in Nablus.

UN experts said "The international community must take action to stop systematic and deliberate housing demolition and sealing, arbitrary displacement and forced evictions of Palestinian people in the occupied West Bank".

A 17-year-old Israeli was lightly injured after being stabbed in the back in the Old City of Jerusalem. The attacker, a 14-year-old Palestinian from the Shuafat refugee camp in East Jerusalem fled the scene before being apprehended on the Temple Mount. The incident has been classified as a terror attack by law enforcement.

While a 22-year-old Israeli border officer was questioning a 13-year-old Palestinian on a bus at the checkpoint near the entrance of the Shuafat refugee camp, the boy stabbed the officer. The police said that an Israeli civilian security guard at the scene shot at the attacker and accidentally hit the officer, who later died of his wounds. The boy was arrested and subsequently charged with murder "under the aggravated circumstances of an act of terrorism".

14 February 
After being shot by Israeli forces during a raid on Far'a refugee camp,  a 17-year-old Palestinian later succumbed to his wounds. The army said it had shot a person holding an explosive device. It was unclear whether the victim was involved.

A 25-year-old Palestinian succumbed to Israeli army gunshot wounds he sustained on January 1, 2021 in an incident at Masafer Yatta. The shooting caused international controversy at the time.

An Israeli soldier who assaulted a well known Palestinian human rights activist, Issa Amro, was given a 10 day sentence by the military. The incident was caught on video taken by a reporter from the New Yorker who was interviewing the victim at the time. The Israeli military account of events differs from that of the New Yorker reporter, Lawrence Wright. In November 2022, the IDF declared a closed military zone around Amro’s home following his complaints of settlers targeting him.

16 February 
According to Peace Now, 38% of the area of the illegal West Bank outposts that the Israeli cabinet authorized on 12 February have an undetermined status. Since the authorization, which included the single biggest settlement announcement ever made, it has been criticized in a joint statement by France, Germany, Italy the United Kingdom and the US. The UNSC is considering a draft resolution requiring Israel "immediately and completely cease all settlement activities in the occupied Palestinian territory."

20 February 
At a UNSC meeting, the Council issued a formal statement condemning Israel's plan for settlement expansion on Palestinian territory. It was the first action the United States has permitted against Israel in six years. The statement said "The Security Council reiterates that continuing Israeli settlement activities are dangerously imperiling the viability of the two-State solution based on the 1967 lines" and "The Security Council expresses deep concern and dismay with Israel's announcement on February 12." The UAE did not push a draft resolution to a vote "given the positive talks between the parties."  Netanyahu's office condemned the formal statement saying "The statement should not have been made and the United States should not have joined it."

Israeli Prime Minister Benjamin Netanyahu's office said no new settlements will be authorized in the coming months.

A 16-year-old Palestinian shot during an Israeli raid on Nablus on 8 February succumbed to his wounds.

21 February 
OCHA issued the Protection of Civilians Report covering the period 31 January – 13 February 2023. During the reporting period, 10 Palestinians (44 year to date) were killed by Israeli forces, 4 Israelis (including 1 foreigner) (11 year to date) were killed by Palestinians. There were 160 Israeli military search and arrest operations in the West Bank (520 year to date), and 35 Palestinian-owned structures were demolished (168 year to date including 50 in East Jerusalem).

22 February 

The Palestinian Health ministry said that during an incursion into Nablus, Israeli forces killed 11 Palestinians including a 72-year-old, while more than 102 were wounded, many by live fire, some critically. Two of the dead are said to be the subject of the arrest operation and killed following the Israeli forces demolition of a building they were occupying.

23 February 
Finance Minister Bezalel Smotrich takes charge of most of the Civil Administration, obtaining broad authority over civilian issues in the West Bank. Israeli peace groups condemned the move as de jure annexation of occupied territories. Rights lawyer Michael Sfard tweeted that the action "entails de jure annexation of the West Bank".

Israeli forces said that six rockets were fired at Israel from Gaza, five of which were intercepted by Iron Dome and the last fell in an uninhabited area. In response, Israeli airstrikes were made on several targets in northern and central Gaza.

The Palestinian Health Ministry said that a 30-year-old Palestinian in a raid on Jenin two weeks earlier succumbed to his wounds.

24 February 
A 22-year-old Palestinian shot by Israeli forces on 23 February during a confrontation at the Arroub refugee camp north of Hebron, succumbed to his wounds.

26 February 

A Palestinian gunman killed two Israeli settlers, a 20 and 22-year-old, reportedly from the illegal settlement of Har Bracha,  near Huwara. The gunman shot them in their car on Highway 60 and they died en route to hospital. Hours later, settlers went to Huwara to "seek revenge".

The settler rampage, likened to a pogrom, affected many townships and villages across the West Bank, and led to the destruction by arson of over 100 cars, and 35 homes, with a further 40 others partially damaged, with Palestinian agricultural lands also torched. A a 37-year-old Palestinian was killed during settler rioting in the town of Za’tara, south of Huwara.

Israel and Palestinian officials meeting for the first time in years in Aqaba, Jordan, said they would work closely to prevent "further violence" and "reaffirmed the necessity of committing to de-escalation on the ground". In a statement, the parties "confirmed their joint readiness and commitment to immediately work to end unilateral measures for a period of 3-6 months. This includes an Israeli commitment to stop discussion of any new settlement units for four months and to stop authorisation of any outposts for six months". The Israeli side would not reverse its earlier decision to legalize nine outposts or its plans to build thousands of additional housing units. The sides agreed to meet again in Sharm el-Sheikh, Egypt, in March.

27 February 
Israeli Prime Minister Benjamin Netanyahu denied any agreement to freeze settlement construction even though Washington had earlier announced the agreement at Aqaba.

A 27-year-old Israeli–American was killed in a shooting attack that took place in various locations in the West Bank near the Dead Sea. The assailants, who arrived by car, shot at two Israeli vehicles and then fled towards Jericho. No injuries were reported in the second shooting. Palestinians say that the Israeli military is conducting searches in the Aqabat Jabr refugee camp and is blocking Jericho's entrances.

The US State Department published its 2021 report on terrorism. After noting that "multiple sources reported a substantial rise in such attacks during 2021", it concluded that "Israeli security personnel often did not prevent settler attacks and rarely detained or charged perpetrators of settler violence".

March

1 March 
Israeli forces raided the Aqabat Jaber refugee camp, killed one Palestinian and arrested three others suspected of involvement in the killing of an American-Israeli on 27 February.

Israeli Attorney General Gali Baharav-Miara opened an investigation into lawmaker Zvika Fogel of the far-right Otzma Yehudit party and a member of the Israeli government coalition on "suspicion of incitement to terrorism". Fogel had publicly supported the Huwara settler rampage. 22 Israeli legal experts wrote to the attorney general to investigate pro-settler government MKs, including far-right minister Bezalel Smotrich, for "inducing war crimes" by their public support for the riots. Going further, Smotrich, when asked why he liked a tweet by Samaria Regional Council deputy mayor Davidi Ben Zion calling "to wipe out the village of Huwara today", said "Because I think the village of Huwara needs to be wiped out. I think the State of Israel should do it."

2 March 
Israeli forces killed a 15-year-old Palestinian and wounded another in Azzun near Qalqilya. Palestinian media reported that the pair threw stones at soldiers. The Israeli military said soldiers shot at suspects who had hurled explosives at forces.

4 March 
OCHA issued the Protection of Civilians Report covering the period 14 – 27 February 2023. During the reporting period, 15 Palestinians (59 year to date) were killed by Israeli forces, 3 Israelis (14 year to date) were killed by Palestinians. There were 175 Israeli military search and arrest operations in the West Bank (701 year to date), and 67 Palestinian-owned structures were demolished (235 year to date including 67 in East Jerusalem).

7 March 
A gunfight ensued during an Israeli army raid in Jenin, resulting in the death of six Palestinians and the injury of 26 others. The military said they entered Jenin to arrest suspects involved in the killing of two Israelis in Huwara on 26 February and that one of the dead was the suspected perpetrator, identified by Israeli military as a 49-year-old Hamas militant. The Jenin brigade stated that its militants shot and threw explosive devices at Israeli soldiers. Palestinian President Mahmoud Abbas' spokesperson denounced the Israeli military's actions, calling it a full-scale war against Palestinians and derailing recent efforts to restore calm.

9 March 
Israeli forces raided Jaba', south of Jenin, killing three Islamic Jihad members inside a car. The military said they were fired at from the car. A 14-year-old Palestinian succumbed to wounds received after he was shot by Israeli forces during the 7 March raid on Jenin. Of 74 Palestinians killed in Israeli raids since the start of 2023, around half were affiliated with militant groups.

Three people were shot and wounded in a suspected terror attack in Tel Aviv after a gunman opened fire on people sitting outside a café. One of the wounded was taken to the hospital in a critical state and the others in serious and moderate conditions. The gunman, later identified as a 23-year-old Palestinian from Ni’lin in the West Bank, who did not have an entry permit to Israel, was shot and killed by police officers and two civilians shorly after the shooting. Two Israeli Arabs suspected of driving Palestinians without work permits into Israeli territory handed themselves in and were arrested. Hamas said the Palestinian was a member of its military wing and his father and brother were also subsequently arrested.

10 March 
A 21-year-old Palestinian man from Saniriya was shot and killed by an Israeli settler near the settlement of Karnei Shomron near Qalqilya. The Israeli military said that the Palestinian, armed with knives and explosive devices, had entered a farm with the intention of carrying out an attack. He allegedly threw two explosive devices before being killed. He was not known to have any relations with militant groups.

Israeli forces killed a 16-year-old Palestinian during confrontations near Qalqilya. According to the military the youth threw a Molotov cocktail at an army post "from a close range."

12 March 
Israeli forces killed three Palestinians at a checkpoint near Nablus. Four Palestinians were traveling in a car. The military said that "gunmen opened fire" at an army position.

16 March 
Israeli forces killed four Palestinians during a raid on Jenin. Two of the dead were claimed by Palestinian sources as a senior member of Hamas and another of Islamic Jihad. A third was a 16-year-old boy and the identity of the fourth is not currently known.
The boy was shot in the head while lying motionless and face down on the ground. Breaking the Silence called the shooting an "extrajudicial execution" and the European Union demanded an immediate transparent investigation into the killing.

17 March 
Israeli forces killed a 23-year-old Palestinian man near Ramallah. The military said the Palestinian approached soldiers and pulled a knife.

18 March 
Palestinian militants fired a rocket from Gaza into southern Israel. The rocket landed in an open area in the southern Israeli city of Sderot and didn’t cause any injury.

19 March 
An Israeli man was shot and seriously wounded while driving with his family through Huwaara in the West Bank. The gunman, a Palestinian from the nearby village of Madama was later arrested. Hamas and Islamic Jihad spokespersons stated that the incident was a 'natural response' to the occupation.

A 64-year-old Israeli man was lightly injured after his vehicle was shot at and had stones thrown at while he drove at the Doar Junction near the West Bank village of Ras Karkar.

Following the earlier Aqaba summit, the parties convened again at Sharm el-Sheikh. Israel reiterated a commitment to freeze talks about establishing new West Bank settlements for four months and to halt the authorization of outposts for a period of six months. The parties agreed to meet again in April.

A 32-year-old Israeli man succumbed to wounds he sustained in a shooting attack in Tel Aviv eleven days prior.

See also 
2023 in Israel
2023 in the State of Palestine

References 

2023
2023 in Israel
2023 in the State of Palestine
Israeli-Palestinian conflict
2023
2023

2023
Israeli-Palestinian conflict